Niedźwiedź  is a village in the administrative district of Gmina Myszyniec, within Ostrołęka County, Masovian Voivodeship, in east-central Poland. Between 1975 and 1998, Niedźwiedź was located within the Ostrołęka Voivodeship

References

Villages in Ostrołęka County